Del Sol Medical Center (Del Sol) is a tertiary care hospital located in El Paso, Texas and is owned and operated by HCA Healthcare. The hospital was founded in 1974 and is licensed as a Level II trauma center. The hospital has 350 beds and is located in the Eastside area of the city.

Del Sol is affiliated with Las Palmas Medical Center and is part of the Las Palmas Del Sol Healthcare System. Del Sol is the only full-service, acute-care hospital in East El Paso.

The medical center offers cardiovascular, emergency, neuroscience, oncology, orthopedic, rehabilitation, surgery, intensive care, wound care, laboratory, and radiologic/imaging services.

References

Hospitals in Texas
Buildings and structures in El Paso, Texas
1974 establishments in Texas
Trauma centers